Catene is an album by the Italian singer Mina, issued in 1984.

In the first CD, Mina covered old hits – originally published between 1950 (Louis Prima's "Buona sera") and 1969 (Lucio Battisti's "Acqua azzurra, acqua chiara") – for the RAI TV show Trent'anni della nostra storia.

Track listing

Vol 1

Vol 2

References

Mina (Italian singer) albums
Italian-language albums
1984 albums